Yevgeniya Latkina (born 1992) is a team handball player from Kazakhstan. She has played on the Kazakhstan women's national handball team, and participated at the 2011 World Women's Handball Championship in Brazil.

References

1992 births
Living people
Kazakhstani female handball players
Handball players at the 2010 Summer Youth Olympics